XHND-TDT is a television station in Durango, in the state of Durango, Mexico. The station broadcasts on virtual channel 12.

Broadcasts start at 7:30 am and continue to midnight daily. The station broadcasts a news-heavy schedule with its own local news programs.

XHND came on the air June 13, 1981 on analog channel 12. It went digital-only on December 22, 2015.

References

Independent television stations in Mexico
1981 establishments in Mexico
Mass media in Durango City
Television channels and stations established in 1981